Orekhovo is a rural locality (a selo) and the administrative center of Orekhovskoye Rural Settlement, Danilovsky District, Volgograd Oblast, Russia. The population was 602 as of 2010. There are 7 streets.

Geography 
Orekhovo is located in steppe, on the right bank of the Medveditsa River, 49 km northeast of Danilovka (the district's administrative centre) by road. Ostrovsky is the nearest rural locality.

References 

Rural localities in Danilovsky District, Volgograd Oblast